CCIR System N is an analog broadcast television system introduced in 1951 and adopted by Argentina, Paraguay and Uruguay (since 1980), paired with the PAL color system (PAL-N). It was also used briefly in Brazil and Venezuela.
 
It employs the 625 line/50 field per second waveform of PAL-B/G, D/K, H, and I, but on a 6 MHz channel with a chrominance subcarrier frequency of 3.582056 MHz (very similar to NTSC). On the studio production level, PAL-B cameras and equipment were used, with the signal then transcoded to PAL-N for broadcast. This allows 625-line, 50-frame/s video to be broadcast in a 6-MHz channel, at some cost in horizontal resolution.

Specifications 
The general System N specifications are listed below.

Television channels were arranged as follows:

See also 
PAL
PAL-N
Broadcast television systems
Television transmitter
Transposer

Notes and references

External links 
 World Analogue Television Standards and Waveforms
 Fernsehnormen aller Staaten und Gebiete der Welt

ITU-R recommendations
Television technology
N, System
Broadcast engineering
CCIR System